Florina Chirilov (born ) is a Romanian female volleyball player. She is part of the Romania women's national volleyball team.

She competed at the 2015 Women's European Volleyball Championship. On club level she plays for SCMU Craiova.

References

External links
Scoresway profile
CEV Player Details

1988 births
Living people
Romanian women's volleyball players
Place of birth missing (living people)